The Pharmaceutical Association of Mauritius (PAM) is a professional society serving pharmacists in Mauritius. It was founded by a group of pharmacists in 1979.

Mission
The goal of the association "is to meet members' needs, encourage personal and professional growth and provide information about events, issues and continuous education opportunities,, industrial news, and a wide variety of membership activities, and to ensure the well-care of patients".

The total number of association members is reaching 400 pharmacists out of Mauritius' population of nearly 1,300,000 inhabitants.

Structure
The Executive Committee of PAM is composed of 11 members who are elected at its Annual General Meeting, and is constituted as follows:
 President
 Vice - President
 Secretary
 Assistant - Secretary
 Treasurer
 Assistant - Treasurer
 5 Members

Regulatory body
The pharmacy sector in Mauritius is regulated by two laws: the Pharmacy Act 1985 and the Dangerous Drugs Act 2000.
PAM works in close collaboration with the Pharmacy Board of the Mauritius Ministry Of Health and Quality of Life on different matters, such as The National Pharmacovigilence.

History
 In 2010 the Pharmaceutical Association of Mauritius delayed its celebration of the Commonwealth Pharmacist Day due to the General Elections being held in Mauritius and of the Football World Cup at the same time. The celebrations were finally held on 7 August, under the chairmanship of Mr Sudhir Misri (as PAM President). The chief guest, Mrs Maya Hanoomanjee, the then Honorable Minister of Health, stated in her speech that she agreed to promulgate the Pharmacy Council Bill and to revisit the Pharmacy Act to bring it in line with other countries. The Commonwealth Pharmacists Day is celebrated every year on 16 June around over 40 Commonwealth countries.
 In November 2012, P.A.M, as a founding member of the 'Fédération Pharmaceutique de l’Océan Indien (F.P.O.I) participated actively in the 1st joint F.P.O.I/C.I.P.F* (Congrès International des Pharmaciens Francophones) conference held at the Sofitel Imperial Hotel in Flic-en-Flac. The congress was chaired by Mr Jayesh Rampadarath (as PAM President).

Affiliations
 The Commonwealth Pharmacists Association (CPA)
 The International Pharmaceutical Federation (FIP)

References

External links
 
 
 Mauritius THE DANGEROUS DRUGS ACT 2000
 The Pharmacy Act 1985
 Mauritius Pharmaceutical Country Profile
 2008 Survey on Medicine Prices, Availability, Affordability and Price Components in the Republic of Mauritius
 FPOI/CIPFcongress
 Commonwealth Pharmacists Association website
 International Pharmaceutical Federation website
 Ministry Of Health and Quality of Life Mauritius

Pharmacy-related professional associations
Organizations established in 1979
Medical and health organisations based in Mauritius